Christopher George Eaton (born 29 March 1984 in Hastings, New Zealand) is a rugby union footballer who plays as a scrum-half  for the Western Force in Super Rugby and for Hawke's Bay Magpies in the ITM Cup. He previously played for the Wellington Hurricanes in the 2012 and 2013 seasons. He is now playing his trade in Krasnodar, Russia with RC Kuban.

References

External links
Hurricanes profile
Hawke's Bay profile
Spanish Rugby Federation player profile
itsrugby.co.uk profile

Living people
New Zealand rugby union players
Hurricanes (rugby union) players
Western Force players
Hawke's Bay rugby union players
Rugby union players from Hastings, New Zealand
1984 births
Rugby union scrum-halves
New Zealand expatriate rugby union players
Expatriate rugby union players in Australia
New Zealand expatriate sportspeople in Australia
People educated at St John's College, Hastings